The BMW M10 is a SOHC inline-4 petrol engine which was produced by BMW from 1962-1988. It was the company's first four-cylinder engine since the BMW 309 ended production in 1936 and was introduced in the New Class sedans.

The M10 was used in many BMW models, with over 3.5 million being produced during its 26 year production run.

Following the introduction of the BMW M40 engine in 1987, the M10 began to be phased out.

Development 
Baron Alex von Falkenhausen— an engineer and racing driver— designed the M10 .

Design 
The M10 has a cast iron block and an aluminum alloy head with hemispherical combustion chambers and two valves per cylinder. It features a forged crankshaft, counterbalance weights, five main bearings and a chain-driven camshaft.

Naming conventions 
The engine was initially known as the "M115" (the last two digits representing the 1.5–litre capacity). Over the years, variants of the engine were given various codes (most of them starting with "M1" and the remaining digits relating to the capacity). In 1975, the engine became known as then "M10", then in 1980 it was given the standardised BMW engine code of M10B18 (where "M10" represents the series, B represents petrol (Benzin in German) and the "18" represented its then 1.8–litre capacity).

The M115 and all related engines have become retroactively known as the "M10" family.

Versions

1499 cc engines 
Lower power models have a compression ratio of 8.0:1, while higher power models have a compressions ratio of 8.8:1. Fuel is supplied via a Solex 38 PDSI carburettor.

Applications:
 1962-1964 BMW 1500
 1975-1977 BMW 1502

1573 cc engines 
The standard specification has a compression ratio of 8.6:1 and uses a Solex 38 PDSI carburettor. The 1600 ti version has a compression ratio of 9.5:1 and uses twin Solex 40 PHH carburettors.

Applications:
 1964-1966 BMW 1600— 
 1966-1975 BMW 1600-2/1602— 
 1967-1968 BMW 1600 ti— 

The M41 version produces , has an 8.3:1 compression ratio and fuel is supplied by a Solex 32 DIDTA carburettor.

Applications:
 1975-1980 E21 316

The M98 version produces , has a compression ratio of 9.5:1 and uses a Pierburg 1B2 carburettor.

Applications:
 1981-1983 E21 315

1766 cc engines

The M10B18 version produces , depending on specification.

Applications:
 1969-1972 1800— , 8.6:1 compression, Solex 36-40 PDSI carburettor
 1971-1975 1802— , 8.6:1 compression, Solex 38 PDSI carburettor
 1980-1983 E21 320i/320is— U.S. only, 8.8:1 compression, Bosch K-Jetronic mechanical fuel injection
 1980-1983 E12 518— South Africa only, 10.0:1 compression, Bosch K-Jetronic mechanical fuel injection
1982-1987 E30 316 — , 9.5:1 compression, Pierburg 2BE carburettor, Ecotronic.
 1982-1988 E30 318i— , 10.0:1 compression, Bosch L-Jetronic electronic fuel injection
 1981-1988 E28 518i— , 9.5:1 compression, Bosch LE-Jetronic mechanical fuel injection.

1773 cc engines 

Applications:
 1963-1968 1800— , 8.6:1 compression, Solex 36-40 PDSI carburettor
 1963-1966 1800ti— , 9.5:1 compression, twin Solex 40 PHH carburettors
 1964-1965 1800tiSA— , 10.5:1 compression, twin Weber DCOE-45 carburettors
 1974-1981 E12 518— , 8.6:1 compression, Solex 38 PDSI carburettor

1990 cc engines 

Applications:
 1965-1970 BMW 2000CS— , 9.3:1 compression, 2x Solex 40 PHH carburettors
 1966-1970 BMW 2000C— , 8.5:1 compression, Solex 40 PDSI carburettor
 1966-1972 BMW 2000— , 8.5:1 compression, Solex 40 PDSI carburettor
 1966-1971 BMW 2000ti— , 9.3:1 compression, 2x Solex 40 PHH carburettors
 1968-1976 BMW 2002— , 8.5:1 compression, Solex 40 PDSI carburettor

The M15 version used the Kugelfischer mechanical fuel injection and produced . It was also known as the tii engine.

Applications:
 1970-1973 2000tii
 1972-1974 2002tii
 1972-1974 E12 520i

The M17 version produces . It has compression ratio of 9.0:1 and uses either a Stromberg 175 CDET or a Solex 4A1 carburettor.

Applications:
 1972-1977 E12 520

The M43/1 version has a compression ratio of 8.1:1 and produces .

Applications:
 1975-1979 E21 320— Solex 32-32 DIDTA carburettor
 1975-1979 E21 320i— USA only, Bosch K-Jetronic mechanical fuel injection

The M64 version produces . It has a compression ratio of 9.3:1 and uses Bosch K-Jetronic mechanical fuel injection.

Applications:
 1975-1978 E21 320i
 1975-1979 E12 520i

The M31 version uses a KKK BLD turbocharger operating @ 7psi and produces . It has a compression ratio of 6.9:1 and uses Schafer PL 04 mechanical fuel injection.

Applications:
 1973-1975 2002 turbo

Related engines 
 The highly successful M12 turbocharged motorsport engine was based on the M10 engine block.

 The S14 engine used in the E30 M3 was based on the M10 block.

See also 
 List of BMW engines

References

M10
Straight-four engines
Gasoline engines by model